The Slovak Evangelical Church of the Augsburg Confession in Serbia (Slovak: Slovenská evanjelická augsburského vyznania cirkev v Srbsku, abbreviated SEAVC) is a Lutheran church in Serbia.

This, the largest Protestant church in former Yugoslavia, has around 40,000 members. They are organized in 27 communities and are led by 20 pastors.

Most members live in Vojvodina, an autonomous province in the Republic of Serbia north of the Sava and Danube; its headquarters are accordingly in Novi Sad. Until the founding of Yugoslavia, the communities belonged to the Evangelical-Lutheran Church in Hungary.

The pastors are trained together with the pastors of the Evangelical Church of the Augsburg Confession in Slovakia, in Bratislava. In parish life, the Slovak language is the most widely used.
The SEAVC is a member of the Lutheran World Federation and of the World Council of Churches.

History 

The history of Protestantism in this region begins in the first half of the 18th century, when evangelical Slovaks from the area around the Tatra Mountains in the former Upper Hungary left their homeland and settled on the southern border of the Habsburg Empire, in hope of being less exposed to the pressure of the Counter-Reformation there. Their first arrival was, according to some sources, in 1720 and according to the other in 1745. Additional migrations were during the 18th and early 19th centuries. Immediately after their arrival, they also organized themselves ecclesiastically, especially after the adoption of the Patent of Toleration in 1781.

In the 18th century, Hungarian and German Lutherans also began to settle in the fertile areas of the Danube River. All of them, together with the Slovak Lutherans, were under the jurisdiction of the Evangelical-Lutheran Church in Hungary until the break up of the Austro-Hungarian monarchy at the end of World War I.

The SEAVC was founded in 1921 as a church of Slovak Christians who previously belonged to the Evangelical-Lutheran Church of Hungary and whose settlement area had been separated from the land of their ancestors after the First World War and awarded to the newly established Yugoslavia. The founding synod was in Stara Pazova. The first Bishop was Adam Vereš, who was elected and installed in 1929 in Stara Pazova.

In 2007 the German Evangelical Church of the Augsburg Confession in Serbia was re-established with the municipality in Zemun, Belgrade. In 2009 it was registered as part of the SEAVC under the name "German Seniorate of the Slovak Evangelical Church A.C. in Serbia – German Evangelical Church Belgrade".

Organization 

The church is grouped into four dioceses (deaneries): Báčsky (Bačka), Banátsky (Banat), Sriemsky (Syrmia), and German Seniorate, each headed and administered by a Senior Dean. The church counts in its geographically relatively widespread diocese 27 congregations and 14 branches (daughter communities). Currently there are 20 pastors, among them four women, as well as four Senior Deans, all headed and administered by the Bishop (Jaroslav Javorník, PhD., elected in 2020). The highest administrative and legislative authority is the Synod, which meets annually.

Theological education of pastors is provided at the Evangelical Lutheran Theological Faculty of the Comenius University in Bratislava, Slovakia, which also trains seminary students of the Evangelical Church of the Augsburg Confession in Slovakia.

Relationships with other churches and organizations 
The SEAVC maintains partnerships with the Evangelical Church of the Augsburg Confession. in Slovakia, the Evangelical Church of the Augsburg Confession in Slovenia, the Evangelical Church in Germany, and the Evangelical Lutheran Church in America.

The SEAVC is a member of the World Council of Churches (since 1963), the Conference of European Churches, the Lutheran World Federation (since 1952), and the Community of Protestant Churches in Europe. It is also a partner church of the Gustav-Adolf-Werk.

Publication and media 
The church publishes approximately 2,650 copies of its monthly magazine Evanjelický hlásnik (Evangelical Messenger), 1,500 copies of its yearbook Ročenka, as well 17,000 copies of its calendar Evanjelický kalendár (Evangelical Calendar). On Radio Television of Vojvodina it has a radio show "Pohľady k výšinám" (Visions to the Heights), which is broadcast once a week.

See also 
 Augsburg Confession
 Evangelical Church of the Augsburg Confession in Slovakia
 Slovaks in Serbia
 Evangelical Church, Zemun
 Slovak Evangelical Church, Šid

References

Literature 
 Ročenka Slovenskej evanjelickej a. v. cirkvi v Srbsku 2009, 2011, 2018, Novi Sad, 
 Svetlana Vojnićová Feldyová: Slovenská evanjelická augsburského vyznania cirkev v Srbsku v slove a obrazoch: odkaz minulosti pre budúcnosť evanjelických Slovákov, 2017, Novi Sad,

External links 

 
 Slovak Evangelical Church A. C. (church building) in Novi Sad

Lutheran World Federation members
Lutheranism in Europe
Slovaks of Vojvodina